The Halluci Nation, formerly known as A Tribe Called Red, is a Canadian electronic music group who blend instrumental hip hop, reggae, moombahton and dubstep-influenced dance music with elements of First Nations music, particularly vocal chanting and drumming. Based in Ottawa, Ontario, the group consists of Tim "2oolman" Hill (Mohawk, of the Six Nations of the Grand River), and Ehren "Bear Witness" Thomas (of the Cayuga First Nation). Former members include co-founder DJ Jon Deck and Dan "DJ Shub" General (of the Cayuga First Nation), who left the band for personal reasons in spring 2014, and was replaced by Hill. Co-founder Ian "DJ NDN" Campeau (of the Nipissing First Nation) left the band for health reasons in October 2017, with the band opting to remain a duo for the time being.

The group's former name was an homage to A Tribe Called Quest, a hip hop group that also had songs that addressed African American social grievances.

The group's music has been labelled as "powwow-step", a style of contemporary powwow music for urban First Nations in the dance club scene; popularized by the media as a description of the band's unique style, the term originated as the title of one of the band's own earliest singles.

Origins 
Inspired by parties for Korean and South Asian youth in Ottawa, DJ NDN (Ian Campeau), a nightclub bouncer turned DJ, became interested in a similar event for Aboriginal youth. After discussing the idea with his friend, Bear Witness (Thomas Ehren Ramon), and fellow disc jockey Dee Jay Frame (Jon Limoges), they began the first night at Ottawa's Babylon nightclub in 2007, calling it Electric Pow Wow. Encouraged by the overwhelmingly positive response, the DJs began holding the event on the second weekend of every month — a schedule that lasted until December 2017. The parties featured a mixture of traditional powwow recordings from Campeau's youth, when he performed as a drummer, mixed with electronic music rhythms and genres such as dubstep, moombahton and dancehall. Bear Witness explained that the group was formed because its members wanted to throw parties for their community, and he also pointed out ATCR's political connotation: "To take over and Indigenize the club space is a really political act [...] As First Nations people everything we do is political".

Music
After releasing a number of tracks online DJing at various dance and aboriginal events, the band released their self-titled debut album as a free internet download in 2012. The album was named as a long-listed nominee for the 2012 Polaris Music Prize on June 14, 2012. In December 2012, ATCR released "The Road" on SoundCloud (P.27), a track that garnered "upward of 50,000 plays within five months" and nearly 300,000 plays as of August 2018. The song's structure revolves around a series of "drops", an important component in electronic dance music derived from Jamaican sound systems as well as syncopated "trap beats" originating from dirty south hip-hop characterized with a booming bass drum and skittering hi-hats. At the time, ATCR "was working on its second record—what would become 2013's Nation II Nation" and has since, for years now, been perceived as one of the leaders of an artistic Indigenous resurgence, exemplifying the remixing of tradition, bridging Indigenous history and futurity.

Their second album, Nation II Nation, was released in 2013 and was named a long-listed nominee for the 2013 Polaris Music Prize on June 13, 2013; in July, it was named to the prize's final 10-album shortlist. The band also won several awards at the 2013 Aboriginal Peoples Choice Music Awards, including Best Group and Best Album for Nation II Nation.

The band has toured extensively across Canada and the United States, as well as performing festival dates in the United Kingdom, Germany and Greece.

They have been featured on CBC Radio's Q, Canada Live, and PBS' Sound Field, and have been playlisted on both CBC Radio 2 and CBC Radio 3 as well as BBC Radio 6 Music.

In 2014, they garnered two Juno Award nominations at the Juno Awards of 2014, for Breakthrough Group of the Year and Electronic Album of the Year, winning the award for Breakthrough Group. The band specifically chose not to submit themselves for consideration in the Aboriginal Album of the Year category.

A Tribe Called Red have also collaborated on and produced one of the last known Das Racist songs, called "Indians From All Directions", as well as the song "A Tribe Called Red" on Angel Haze's album Dirty Gold.

In 2014, they released "Burn Your Village to the Ground", a non-album protest song about the complicated aboriginal relationship with the colonialist connotations of Thanksgiving.

In 2015, they released pro-wrestling-themed EP Suplex, with appearances from Smalltown DJs, as well as a remix of Buffy Sainte-Marie's song "Working for the Government". They also won for Best Music Video in 2015 by the Native American Music Awards.

In 2016, they released LP We Are the Halluci Nation in September. Guest collaborators on the album included Narcy, Yasiin Bey, Lido Pimienta, Shad, Tanya Tagaq, Joseph Boyden and Black Bear.

The group won the Jack Richardson Producer of the Year Award at the Juno Awards of 2017.

The group won the Group of the Year award at the Juno Awards of 2018.

In April 2018 the band performed at a TED talk during TED2018.

Following the release of their 2016 album We Are the Halluci Nation, the group released a number of singles in 2019.

In April 2019 the group released a remix of Keith Secola's song "NDN Kars". The group put a "modern twist" on the '90s hit. Following the release of the "NDN Kars" remix the group released "The OG', which was their first original song since the release of We Are the Halluci Nation. A few months later the group released "Ba Na Na", which features Canadian rapper Haviah Mighty, singer Odario and Chippewa Travellers. In September 2019, the band released "Tanokumbia", a single featuring Texan DJ El Dusty and Canadian Pow Wow drummers and singers, Black Bear.

In 2020 A Tribe Called Red released "Land Back" during the 2020 Canadian pipeline and railway protests. "Land Back" features Boogey the Beat and Chippewa Travellers. The song was available for free and made in support of the Wetʼsuwetʼen First Nations opposing the construction of a Coastal GasLink Pipeline. The song was intended for use by "anyone working to promote Indigenous land sovereignty and 'a true nation-to-nation discussion between the Indigenous nations of Turtle Island and our Canadian settlers.

On April 5, 2021, the group changed their name to The Halluci Nation.

Powwow-step 
Powwow-step or pow wow step or sometimes electric powwow are the terms the band used to describe their music. The sound described under this term is characterized by the mixture of First Nations pow wow and electronic music styles. The name of the genre is derived from pow wow and dubstep. Ian Campeau of the group has said, regarding the genre, "[a]ll we really did was match up dance music with dance music".

Film and television

The band was featured prominently in the 2017 music documentary When They Awake, by filmmakers P. J. Marcellino and Hermon Farahi. The film was the opening night gala selection at the 2017 Calgary International Film Festival.

In 2020, the Showtime mini-series The Good Lord Bird prominently featured "Electric Pow Wow Drum" (from the 2013 self-titled album) in their trailer and the soundtrack. That same year, the song "Sisters" was featured in the third season of the Netflix series Kipo and the Age of Wonderbeasts.

The Halluci Nation co-composed music for the sitcom Rutherford Falls, which premiered on NBC's streaming service Peacock in April 2021. The show centers on relationships between members of a northeastern town and a fictional Native American tribe.

Activism
The band found its roots when Bear Witness and Ian Campeau realized their home city of Ottawa had dance nights that represented every culture there but their own, so deciding to, "throw a party," was more than just for fun—these Electric Pow Wows were to portray their Aboriginal culture within urban centres where historically, its involvement has been erased. Thus, the band has been involved in activism from its very origin.

They have been vocal supporters of Idle No More, a peaceful revolution launched in November 2012 to protest the Harper government's introduction of Bill C-45, which critics, including many First Nations people, claimed threatened both the environment and Aboriginal sovereignty.

In 2013, they issued a public statement asking non-aboriginal fans to refrain from cultural appropriation by not wearing headdresses and war paint to their shows. Furthermore, Campeau filed a human rights complaint against an amateur football club in Ottawa that was using "Redskins" as its club name. Also, through its piece "The Road", the band provided "catalyzing soundtrack to the Idle No More movement sweeping across Turtle Island", advocating in favor of "Indigenous peoples reclaiming the land, moving to reverse the ongoing dispossessions of the settler state". The track has made some recall a series of walks along roads, like the "Longest Walk" from Alcatraz to Washington in 1978.

In 2014, the band withdrew from a scheduled performance at the official opening ceremonies of the Canadian Museum for Human Rights, citing concerns about the museum's depiction of indigenous human rights issues.

Further than distinct actions like the aforementioned, the group is also activist through the expression of their music itself. "I think in our own community," Bear Witness told The National in 2013, "it's not something that people would have been ready for us to have been doing 10 or 15 years ago, to be sampling powwow music and bring it into clubs. I mean, that's really pushing boundaries." Using music as a platform to educate, they have broken away from homogenous genres and at once promoted appreciation and respect for First Nations cultures while combating stereotypes and appropriation.

"It's mind-blowing that this whole conversation that we've been having the past few decades about the portrayal of our people hasn't gone anywhere," said Bear Witness. "It hasn't changed." However, the band is positive about making a change moving forward. "All those things that we're trying to talk about with Idle No More, with aboriginal rights, you're feeling it and you're getting it without a word having to be said. Because when you feel that, you're feeling what we all feel."

In 2020, the band released "Land Back". The song was available for free and intended to show support to the Wetʼsuwetʼen First Nations who were opposing the construction of a Coastal GasLink Pipeline. The song was hoped to be used by those involved during the 2020 Canadian pipeline and railway protests.

Albums 
A Tribe Called Red (2012)

This first album by ATCR was nominated for the 2012 Polaris Music Prize and it was in The Washington Posts Top 10 albums of the year. After their debut, ATCR went on tour across North America and Europe, where they participated to the World Music Expo in Greece.

Nation II Nation (2013)

ATCR's second album was nominated for a Polaris Prize and it also had a political inclination as it contributed to the conversation that revolves around Indigenous rights and cultural appropriation. The name of the album has two layers of meaning. On one hand, the members of the group are originally from different communities, as Campeau explained: "I'm Ojibway, Anishinaabe. The other two guys, Dan and Bear, are both Cayuga [...] Historically, we're enemies. So together, in forming this group, that's a nation-to-nation relationship". On the other hand, there is a "nation-to-nation relationship from the settler nations to the First Nations" (Ian "DJ NDN" Campeau).

We Are the Halluci Nation (2016)

The third album of A Tribe Called Red was released in September 2016. The first voice that is heard in this album is that of John Trudell, a Native American activist, poet and musician. In fact, with this work ATCR wanted to celebrate contemporary Indigenous culture.

One More Saturday Night (2021)

The band, now called The Halluci Nation, released its fourth album in July 2021. They've collaborated with artists such as Black Bear, John Trudell, and Northern Voice whom they worked with on their 2016 album We Are the Halluci Nation.

Discography

Albums
A Tribe Called Red (2012)
Nation II Nation (2013)
We Are the Halluci Nation (2016)
One More Saturday Night (2021)

EPs
Moombah Hip Moombah Hop (2011)
Trapline (2013)
Suplex (2015)
Stadium Pow Wow (2016)

Awards and nominations

References

External links
Official website

Canadian dance music groups
Canadian hip hop groups
Musical groups from Ottawa
First Nations musical groups
Canadian instrumental musical groups
Musical groups established in 2007
2007 establishments in Ontario
Juno Award for Breakthrough Group of the Year winners
Juno Award for Group of the Year winners
Jack Richardson Producer of the Year Award winners